General Cowan may refer to:

David Tennant Cowan (1896–1983), British Indian Army major general
James Cowan (British Army officer) (born 1964), British Army major general
Samuel Cowan (born 1941), British Army general

See also
John Cowans (1862–1921), British Army general
Benjamin R. Cowen (1831–1908), Union Army brevet brigadier general